Kubaner Idish Wort ('Cuban Jewish Word') was a communist Yiddish-language newspaper published from Havana, Cuba 1942–1950. In the beginning it was a semi-monthly, whilst as of the late 1940s it was published semi-weekly. Kubaner Idish Wort was published by the communist-oriented Folks-tzenter ('People's Centre'). It was initially edited by Ch. Novomodny, and at a later stage by M. Epstein.

References

Ashkenazi Jewish culture in North America
Defunct newspapers published in Cuba
Newspapers established in 1942
Publications disestablished in 1950
Mass media in Havana
Newspapers published in Cuba
Communism in Cuba
Yiddish communist newspapers
Jewish Cuban history
Jews and Judaism in Havana
Secular Jewish culture in North America
Yiddish culture in North America
1942 establishments in Cuba
1950 disestablishments in Cuba